Aalberg is a surname. Notable people with this surname include:

 Espen Aalberg (born 1975), Norwegian jazz musician 
 Ida Aalberg (1857–1915), Finnish actress
 John Aalberg (born 1960), American cross-country skier
 John O. Aalberg (1897–1984), sound technician and Academy Award winner

Swedish-language surnames
Norwegian-language surnames